In college football, 2016 NCAA football bowl games may refer to:

2015–16 NCAA football bowl games, for games played in January 2016 as part of the 2015 season.
2016–17 NCAA football bowl games, for games played in December 2016 as part of the 2016 season.